Mount Helena City Park is a  park in Helena, Montana. The park includes six trails up and around the mountain, some of which connect to other trails in nearby Helena National Forest. Other trails go to the cave nicknamed "Devil's Kitchen", to the big letter "H" on the side of the mountain (the "H" was repainted April 2015 for the first time since 2008) overlooking the city, and to the summit of the mountain. The park is free of admission and is maintained by the City of Helena and local conservation and recreation groups from the Helena area. It was listed on the National Register of Historic Places in 1997.

Trails

References

External links

 Mount Helena City Park trails and pictures
Prickly Pear Land Trust

Helena, Montana
Helena
Protected areas of Lewis and Clark County, Montana
Parks in Montana
Mountains of Lewis and Clark County, Montana
Tourist attractions in Helena, Montana
Historic districts in Montana
National Register of Historic Places in Lewis and Clark County, Montana
Parks on the National Register of Historic Places in Montana